Menangle Park railway station is located on the Main South line in New South Wales, Australia. It serves the town of Menangle Park, opening on 26 September 1937.

Menangle Park previously had two additional platforms and run rounds to service the adjacent Menangle Park Paceway. These opened in 1914 and closed in 1963 with the platforms still in situ.

Platforms & services
Menangle Park has two side platforms. It is serviced by NSW TrainLink Southern Highlands Line services travelling between Campbelltown and Moss Vale with 2 weekend morning services to Sydney Central and limited evening services to Goulburn. Both platforms are 2 cars long. Opal validators are provided, however there are no topup or ticket issuing facilities.

The station has two crossovers to the south, as the section around Glenlee Junction (to the north of Menangle Park) is bidirectional.

Transport links
Busabout operates one route via Menangle Park station:
889: Menangle to Campbelltown

References

External links

Menangle Park station details Transport for New South Wales
Signal diagram 1961

Railway stations in Australia opened in 1937
Regional railway stations in New South Wales
Short-platform railway stations in New South Wales, 2 cars
Main Southern railway line, New South Wales